Hand Cranked is the second album by the music producer Bibio. It was released on 7 March 2006 on Mush Records.

Critical reception
XLR8R wrote that "several songs wouldn’t be memorable if it weren’t for their ancient sound quality. But in our age of bloodless pop productions, [Bibio] is still welcome."

Track listing

References

External links

2006 albums
Bibio albums
Mush Records albums